The Adelaide Cup is a South Australian Jockey Club Group 2 Thoroughbred handicap horse race for three-year-olds and older, run over 3,200 metres at Morphettville Racecourse in Adelaide, Australia on the second Monday in March. Total prize money for the race is A$302,250.

History

The first Adelaide Cup was raced on 21 April 1864 at Thebarton Racecourse, where Mile End is today. The race had stakes of 500 sovereigns with an additional sweep of 50 sovereigns to induce owners from other colonies to compete in the race. Victoria's P. Dowling's Falcon carried 10 stone 1 pound and ridden by jockey J.Morrison won the race in a time of 3:50.50. A crowd of 7,000 or 8,000 was present for the event.

The race was run at Weight for Age over two miles from 1864–68.
In 1869, still at Thebarton Racecourse, it was run as a handicap race over two miles. There was no Cup raced in 1870 or 1871. 
The Cup resumed in 1872 and was run at "The Old Course" (Victoria Park Racecourse) over two miles with a smaller stake of 200 sovereigns and an additional sweep of 15 sovereigns. In 1876 the race was held at Morphettville Racecourse. In 1884 the race was run over 13 furlongs or  miles (~2,600 metres), as was every race held until 1941.

The Totalizator, whose operation on South Australian racecourses became legal in 1880, was abolished by the Totalizator Repeal Act of 1883, and the SAJC suffered a financial collapse. The racecourse was mortgaged and the 1885 Adelaide Cup was held at Flemington, Victoria, and was not held for three more years. In 1889, running of the Cup resumed at Morphettville when Sir Richard Baker and A. O. Whitington took over the course.

Starting on 1 March 1942, there was a ban on racing due to World War II and thus the race was not held in 1942 and 1943.

In 1980 due to renovation of Morphettville Racecourse the race was run at Victoria Park Racecourse and in 2000 the Cup race day was abandoned due to rain and was rescheduled later and also run at Victoria Park.

The highest ever Cup attendance was in 1951 when 50,000 spectators attended.

The cup is held on the second Monday of March since March 2006. Before 2006 it was held in May. It was first run in 1864, just three years after the Melbourne Cup commenced.
The day received public holiday status in 1973 and became a major social event in South Australia. In the decade since the move of the Adelaide Cup to March, attendance has fallen to a third of previous levels, seeing 10,500 people trackside in 2015. This is due to use of the public holiday by other "Mad March" events (the Adelaide Festival of the Arts, the associated Fringe Festival, the WOMAD world music festival, a touring car race the weekend prior). Thoroughbred Racing SA and the South Australian Jockey Club wish to move the race and its associated public holiday out of March. However the South Australian government Minister for Racing said "We can't be at the whim of a racing club that wants to dictate when the public holiday is going to be" and suggests if the race be moved again then it be held on a Saturday.

Grade
The race was a Principal Race from 1864 until 1979 and a Group 1 race from 1979 until 2006.
The race was downgraded from Group 1 to Group 2 status following a decision by the Australian Pattern Committee in 2007.

Winners

 2023 - Rebel Racer 
 2022 - Daqiansweet Junior 
 2021 - Good Idea
 2020 – King Of Leogrance
 2019 – Surprise Baby
 2018 – Fanatic
 2017 – Annus Mirabilis
 2016 – Purple Smile
 2015 – Tanby
 2014 – Outback Joe
 2013 – Norsqui
 2012 – Rialya
 2011 – Muir
 2010 – Capecover
 2009 – Zavite
 2008 – Lacey Underall
 2007 – Gallic
 2006 – Exalted Time
 2005 – Demerger
 2004 – Pantani
 2003 – Pillage 'N Plunder
 2002 – The A Train
 2001 – Apache King
 2000 – Bohemiath
 1999 – Sheer Kingston
 1998 – The Hind
 1997 – Cronus
 1996 – French Resort
 1995 – Scrupulous
 1994 – Our Pompeii
 1993 – Our Pompeii
 1992 – Subzero
 1991 – Ideal Centreman
 1990 – Water Boatman
 1989 – Lord Reims
 1988 – Lord Reims
 1987 – Lord Reims
 1986 – Mr. Lomondy
 1985 – Toujours Mio
 1984 – Moss Kingdom
 1983 – Amarant
 1982 – Dealer's Choice
 1981 – Just A Dash
 1980 – Yashmak
 1979 – Panamint
 1978 – Hyperno
 1977 – Reckless
 1976 – Grand Scale
 1975 – Soulman
 1974 – Phar Ace
 1973 – Tavel
 1972 – Wine Taster
 1971 – Laelia
 1970 – Tavel
 1969 – Gnapur
 1968 – Rain Lover
 1967 – Fulmen
 1966 – Prince Camillo
 1965 – Hunting Horn
 1964 – Jamagne
 1963 – Woolstar
 1962 – Cheong Sam
 1961 – Far Away Places
 1960 – Lourdale
 1959 – Mac
 1958 – Star Aim
 1957 – Borgia
 1956 – Pushover
 1955 – Storm Glow
 1954 – Spearfolio
 1953 – Royal Pageant
 1952 – Aldershot
 1951 – Peerless Fox
 1950 – Peerless Fox
 1949 – Colin
 1948 – Sanctus
 1947 – Beau Cheval
 1946 – Little Tich
 1945 – Blankenburg
 1944 – Chief Watchman
 1943 – †race not held
 1942 – †race not held
 1941 – Yodvara
 1940 – Apostrophe
 1939 – Son Of Aurous
 1938 – Dartford
 1937 – Donaster
 1936 – Cape York
 1935 – Mellion
 1934 – Sir Roseland
 1933 – Infirmiere
 1932 – Romany Rye
 1931 – Suzumi
 1930 – Temptation
 1929 – Parallana
 1928 – Altimeter
 1927 – Three Kings
 1926 – Spearer
 1925 – Stralia
 1924 – Wynette
 1923 – King Ingoda
 1922 – Repique
 1921 – Sir Marco
 1920 – Wee Gun
 1919 – Dependence
 1918 – Elsdon
 1917 – Greencap
 1916 – St. Spasa
 1915 – Naxbery
 1914 – Hamburg Belle
 1913 – Midnight Sun
 1912 – Eye Glass
 1911 – Eye Glass
 1910 – Medaglia
 1909 – Kooringa
 1908 – Destinist
 1907 – Spinaway
 1906 – Dynamite
 1905 – Troytown
 1904 – Sport Royal
 1903 – Sojourner
 1902 – The Idler
 1901 – Gunga Din
 1900 – Tarquin
 1899 – Contrast
 1898 – Paul Pry
 1897 – Mora
 1896 – Warpaint
 1895 – Elswick
 1894 – Port Admiral
 1893 – Vakeel
 1892 – Jericho
 1891 – Stanley
 1890 – Shootover
 1889 – The Lawyer
 1888 – race not held
 1887 – race not held
 1886 – race not held
 1885 – ‡Lord Wilton 
 1884 – Malua
 1883 – Sting
 1882 – Euclid
 1881 – Totalisator
 1880 – First Water
 1879 – Banter
 1878 – Glenormiston
 1877 – Aldinga
 1876 – Impudence
 1875 – Lurline
 1874 – Ace Of Trumps
 1873 – Dolphin
 1872 – Australian Buck
 1871 – race not held
 1870 – race not held
 1869 – Norma
 1868 – Cupbearer
 1867 – Cowra
 1866 – Cowra
 1865 – Ebor
 1864 – Falcon

† Race not held due to a ban on war time racing in the state.
‡ Race held at Flemington, Victoria after financial collapse of the SAJC which followed the Totalizator Repeal Act 1883.

See also

 List of Australian Group races
 Group races

References

Horse races in Australia
Open long distance horse races
Sport in Adelaide
Public holidays in Australia
Autumn events in Australia